Valeri Ivanovich Vasiliev (3 August 1949 – 19 April 2012) was a Soviet and Russian ice hockey defenceman, who played for Dynamo Moscow. Internationally he competed for the Soviet Union. An eight-time Soviet all-star, Vasiliev was captain of the national team, for which he played 13 years. He was born in Gorky, Soviet Union.

Playing career
Vasiliev played on nine Soviet gold medal teams at the IIHF World Championships. He was named the tournament's best defenceman in 1973, 1977, and 1979 and was a five-time all-star. He was on the gold medal team at the 1972 and 1976 Winter Olympics, as well as at the 1981 Canada Cup, where he captained the winning team. He also played in the 1972 Summit Series, 1976 Canada Cup, and 1980 Winter Olympics. He coined the phrase "kiss the ice" after winning in 1972 Winter Olympics. He played in the Soviet Championship League from 1967 to 1984, playing more games than anyone else in the league's history.

In 1978 Vasiliev was awarded the Order of the Red Banner of Labour. Vasiliev, who had won the 1978 world championship not long after he had suffered a heart attack, died from heart failure in 2012.

Career statistics

Regular season

International

References

Bibliography

External links
 
 Valery Vasiliev at CCCP International
 Valeri Vasiliev's obituary

1949 births
2012 deaths
Burials in Troyekurovskoye Cemetery
Dynamo sports society athletes
Expatriate sportspeople in Denmark
HC Dynamo Moscow players
Honoured Masters of Sport of the USSR
Ice hockey players at the 1972 Winter Olympics
Ice hockey players at the 1976 Winter Olympics
Ice hockey players at the 1980 Winter Olympics
IIHF Hall of Fame inductees
Medalists at the 1972 Winter Olympics
Medalists at the 1976 Winter Olympics
Medalists at the 1980 Winter Olympics
Members of the Civic Chamber of the Russian Federation
Olympic gold medalists for the Soviet Union
Olympic ice hockey players of the Soviet Union
Olympic medalists in ice hockey
Olympic silver medalists for the Soviet Union
Recipients of the Order of Friendship of Peoples
Recipients of the Order of Honour (Russia)
Recipients of the Order of the Red Banner of Labour
Russian ice hockey defencemen
Sportspeople from Nizhny Novgorod
Soviet expatriate ice hockey players
Soviet expatriate sportspeople in Hungary
Soviet ice hockey defencemen
Torpedo Nizhny Novgorod players
Újpesti TE (ice hockey) players